The 2014 Ironman World Championship was a long distance triathlon competition that was held on October 11, 2014 in Kailua-Kona, Hawaii. The event was won by Sebastian Kienle of Germany and Australia's Mirinda Carfrae. It was the 38th edition of the Ironman World Championship, which has been held annually in Hawaii since 1978, with an additional race in 1982. The championship was organized by the World Triathlon Corporation (WTC) and awarded a total purse prize of $650,000.

Championship results

Men

Women

Qualification
For entry into the 2014 World Championship race, amateur athletes were required to qualify through a performance at an Ironman or selected Ironman 70.3 series race. Entry into the championship race could also be obtained through a random allocation lottery, through Ironman's Legacy program, or through the Ironman’s charitable eBay auction. The division of athletes is divided into professional, age group, physically challenged, and hand cycle divisions.

For professional triathletes, a point system determines which professional triathletes qualify for the championship race. To qualify, points are earned by competing in WTC sanctioned Ironman and Ironman 70.3 events throughout the qualifying year. For the 2014 championship race that period was August 31, 2013 to August 24, 2014. The top 50 male and top 35 female pros in points at the end of the qualifying year qualified to race in Kona. An athlete's five highest scoring races were counted in the point totals. At least one Ironman race must have been completed and only three Ironman 70.3 races counted towards an athlete's overall point total. Prior champions of a WTC Championship receive an automatic entry for the Championship race for a period of five years after their last championship performance provided that they competed in at least one full-distance Ironman race during the qualifying year. Their entry does not count toward the number of available qualifying spots. Available prize money to professional triathletes for qualifying race ranged from $25,000 to $125,000.

The 2014 Ironman series consisted of 29 Ironman races plus the 2013 Ironman World Championship which was itself a qualifier for the 2014 Championship.

Qualifying Ironman races

Qualifying pro men

Qualifying pro women

Disabled

Racing driver and paracyclist Alex Zanardi completed the 2014 Ironman World Championship in a time of 9:47:14, ranking 272nd overall and 19th out of 247 in the 45- to 49-year-old age group category. He used a handbike for the cycling section and an Olympic wheelchair for the running section.

References

External links
Ironman website
Professional Triathlete Qualifying Rules

Ironman World Championship
Ironman
Sports competitions in Hawaii
2014 in sports in Hawaii
Triathlon competitions in the United States